José Marco may refer to:
 José Marco Davó, Spanish film actor
 José Marco (politician), Spanish politician
 José Marco (cyclist)